Major-General Charles James Blomfield  (26 May 1855 – 3 March 1928) was a British Indian Army officer.

Military career
Educated at Haileybury and the Royal Military College, Sandhurst, Blomfield was commissioned in the 20th Regiment of Foot in 1875. He became Acting Military Secretary to the Commander-in-chief, Bombay Army in 1891, Deputy Assistant Adjutant-General in Bombay in 1897 and Assistant Adjutant-General Bombay later in the year.

Blomfield saw action in the Sudan Expedition in 1898, for which he was appointed a Companion of the Distinguished Service Order, and then took part in the Relief of Ladysmith in late 1899 during the Second Boer War. Following the end of the war in June 1902, he became commander of the Harrismith and Natal Sub-District, with the local rank of brigadier-general on the staff.

He was later appointed General Officer Commanding Wessex Division in January 1909 and General Officer Commanding 1st (Peshawar) Division in October 1912. His last appointment was as General Officer Commanding 66th (2nd East Lancashire) Division in November 1915, a post he held until February 1917.

He was appointed a Companion of the Order of the Bath in 1906.

References

Sources

External links
Biography of Charles J. Blomfield

|-

1855 births
1928 deaths
Military personnel from Devon
Indian Army generals of World War I
British Indian Army generals
Companions of the Order of the Bath
Companions of the Distinguished Service Order
People educated at Haileybury and Imperial Service College
Graduates of the Royal Military College, Sandhurst
Lancashire Fusiliers officers
British military personnel of the Second Boer War
British military personnel of the Mahdist War